Patrick George Ross (born March 16, 1983) is a former American football offensive lineman. He was signed by the Seattle Seahawks as an undrafted free agent in 2006. He graduated from St. Xavier High School in 2001 and played college football at Boston College.

Ross has also been a member of the New England Patriots, Indianapolis Colts, Carolina Panthers and Arizona Cardinals.

References

External links
Arizona Cardinals bio 
Boston College Eagles bio
Carolina Panthers bio
Indianapolis Colts bio
New England Patriots bio

1983 births
Living people
Players of American football from Cincinnati
American football centers
American football offensive guards
Boston College Eagles football players
Seattle Seahawks players
New England Patriots players
Indianapolis Colts players
Carolina Panthers players
Arizona Cardinals players
St. Xavier High School (Ohio) alumni